Liveware was used in the computer industry as early as 1966 to refer to computer users, often in humorous contexts, by analogy with hardware and software.

It is a slang term used to denote people using (attached to) computers, and is based on the need for a human, or liveware, to operate the system using hardware and software. Other words meaning the same or similar to liveware include wetware, meatware and jellyware. Meatware and jellyware are most often used by internal customer support personnel as slang terms when referencing human operating errors.
The term liveware is found in the Culture novels by Iain M. Banks. A Culture Ship is named "Liveware Problem".

References

Computer jargon